is a railway station in the city of Hirosaki, Aomori, Japan, operated by the private railway operator Kōnan Railway Company.

Lines

Station layout
Undōkōenmae Station has a one side platform serving a single bi-directional track. The station building is unattended.

Adjacent stations

History
The station opened on September 10, 1977.

Surrounding area
Hirosaki Athletic Park and Sports Recreation Centre

See also

 List of railway stations in Japan

External links
 
Location map 

Railway stations in Aomori Prefecture
Konan Railway
Hirosaki
Railway stations in Japan opened in 1977